Thomas Coltrin Keefer CMG (4 November 1821 – 7 January 1915) was a Canadian civil engineer.

Biography 
Born into a United Empire Loyalist family in Thorold Township, Upper Canada, the son of George Keefer and Jane Emory, née McBride, his father was chairman of the Welland Canal Company. After attending Upper Canada College he began his engineering training by working on the Erie Canal and continued his learning experience later on the Welland Canal. He became well known for his writings, particularly Philosophy of Railroads and The Canals of Canada: Their Prospects and Influence, and surveyed a railway connecting Kingston, Ontario, and Toronto (1851), was in charge of the survey for a line between Montreal and Kingston, and determined the site for the Victoria Bridge that crosses the St. Lawrence River into Montreal.

However, his engineering focus was on water supply. He became chief engineer of the Montreal Water Board and also built the Ottawa Water Works. One of his best-known achievements was the construction of the Hamilton Waterworks, an achievement commemorated by the preservation of the pumping station as the Hamilton Museum of Steam and Technology. His design for the foundations of the Victoria Bridge (“Keefer’s Shoes”) was used in the construction of the bridge. Keefer was a co-founder and the first president of the Canadian Society of Civil Engineers. He was also president of the American Society of Civil Engineers (1888) and of the Canadian Institute. He was made a fellow of the Royal Society of Canada in 1890 and was its president from 1898 to 1899.

He served as chief engineer of the Montreal Water Board and designed the water-supply system for Hamilton, Ontario (1859), as well as the waterworks in Ottawa (1874). His Hamilton pumping station, with its working Gartshore beam engines, has been declared a national historic site. As the "Dean of Canadian engineers," he received many honours, including the presidency of the American Society of Civil Engineers. He was appointed a Companion of the Order of St Michael and St George and an officer of the French Legion of Honour.

He died in Ottawa in 1915. His son, Charles Keefer, was also a notable Canadian civil engineer.

The Keefer Medal was established in 1942, and is awarded annually by the Canadian Society for Civil Engineering for the best civil engineering paper in hydro-technical, transportation or environmental engineering.

References

Bibliography 
 
 
 

1821 births
1915 deaths
Canadian civil engineers
Fellows of the Royal Society of Canada
Upper Canada College alumni
People from Thorold
Persons of National Historic Significance (Canada)
Officiers of the Légion d'honneur
Companions of the Order of St Michael and St George